Florini may refer to:

Florina, a town in Greece

People with the name
Francis C. Florini, an American politician
Ann Florini, an American clinical professor
Giovanni Florimi, an Italian engraver